The Columbus street circuit was a temporary street circuit located in Columbus, Ohio, which hosted IMSA GT Championship races between 1985 and 1988.

Lap records

The fastest official race lap records at the Columbus street circuit are listed as:

Notes

References

Defunct motorsport venues in the United States
Motorsport venues in Ohio
IMSA GT Championship circuits